Mountain Project is a website which serves as a guidebook to more than 170,000 climbing routes across the world. The website is operated by Adventure Projects Inc., a Boulder, Colorado-based company, founded by Nick Wilder and Andy Laakmann in 2005 and purchased on June 11, 2015 by REI. Adventure Projects, Inc. subsequently became independent and has since been acquire by onX.

Adventure Projects Inc. has expanded from its initial focus by creating MTBProject.com, a website for mountain bike trail maps, HikingProject.com for hiking trails, PowderProject.com for backcountry skiing trails and TrailRunProject.com for cross-country running trails.

References 

2005 establishments in Colorado
Online companies of the United States
Companies based in Colorado
Software companies established in 2005
Internet properties established in 2005
Map companies of the United States
American companies established in 2005